Hold Me Closer may refer to:
 "Hold Me Closer" (Cornelia Jakobs song)
 "Hold Me Closer" (Elton John and Britney Spears song)

See also
 "Tiny Dancer (Hold Me Closer)", a 2009 song by Ironik featuring Chipmunk